WWSM (1510 AM) was a daytime-only radio station. Licensed to Annville-Cleona, Pennsylvania, United States, the station was owned by Patrick H. Sickafus and, until July 2022, aired a classic country format and featured programming from USA Radio Network and Westwood One.

In July 2022, WWSM ceased operations. The Federal Communications Commission cancelled the station's license on November 7, 2022, for failing to file an application for renewal.

References

External links
FCC History cards for WWSM (covering 1968-1981 as WAHT)
FCC Station Search Details for DWWSM (Facility ID: 54343)

WSM
Radio stations established in 1968
1968 establishments in Pennsylvania
Radio stations disestablished in 2022
2022 disestablishments in Pennsylvania
WSM
Defunct radio stations in the United States
WSM